Pentacyphus  is a genus of plants in the family Apocynaceae, first described as a genus in 1906. It is native to South America.

Species
 Pentacyphus andinus (Ball) Liede – Peru     
 Pentacyphus lehmannii (Schltr.) Liede – Colombia, Ecuador

formerly included
Pentacyphus tamanus (Morillo) Liede, synonym of  Tetraphysa tamana Morillo – Venezuela

References

Asclepiadoideae
Apocynaceae genera